Detectives o ladrones..? is a 1967 Mexican comedy film starring Viruta and Capulina.

External links

Mexican comedy films
1960s Mexican films